Ek Ladka Ek Ladki (translation: A boy and a girl) is a 1992 Indian Hindi romantic comedy film directed by Vijay Sadanah, starring Salman Khan and Neelam Kothari. The film was released on 19 June 1992. The film is largely a remake of Hollywood movie Overboard released in 1987.

Plot 
Bhagwati Prasad (Anupam Kher) looks after the vast estate of his deceased brother, assisted by his wife, and brother-in-law, Markutey. Bhagwati has got into debt and has been embezzling money in order to pay his debtors. His spoiled and rude niece, Renu (Neelam), who resides in the United States decides to pay them a visit. Bhagwati welcomes her and makes her feel at home, but Renu is not easily satisfied until she gets a speedboat so that she can be on her own. Alerted by her lawyer, she starts to scrutinize recent transactions and finds 1.5  million rupees missing. She asks Bhagwati to provide her with an explanation within 2 days. Then she gets into her speed boat, only to get involved in an accident, planned by Bhagwati, and disappears. She was saved by some of the fishermen nearby and was handed over to the Police. Police then look for her family members as she suffers from amnesia, due to the accident. After no one shows up for a long time, Raja (Salman Khan) takes advantage of this only to take revenge of an old encounter between them. He proves to the police that Renu is his lost wife by telling of a mark on her lower back. Raja tells her that they have three kids together and the kids help him in lying to her. In truth the kids are his dead brother’s boys. Raja, makes her realise the pain of a poor person and in this way, but soon realises how much she has grown to care for him and the kids. Soon, they start loving each other. Bhagwati is all set to take over the estate when the estate's lawyer gets a Court Order freezing all the cash, bank, and assets until such time Renu is found or her body is located. The months go by, Bhagwati hires men to look for Renu, and they soon find her and lead him to her. Bhagwati finds out that she has lost her memory, and is living with a man named Raja (Salman Khan) and his three young nephews. This time, Bhagwati will make sure that she will not escape alive, even if it means to kill Raja and the three children as well. Renu regains her memories after recognizing her uncle (Bhagwati). In the end, the police arrive at the scene and arrest Bhagwati and his crooks. She realises that Raja betrayed her by not telling her the truth. In the end, before leaving for the U.S.A she also realises that the kids and she herself can't stay without each other, and she loves Raja too. This forces her to stay back, as she gives them a surprise after she reaches home back before Raja and the kids, as they went in search of her at the airport. In the epilogue, it is shown that Raja and Renu are living together happily with the three boys who now permanently call them mummy-papa, and also have a daughter of their own now.

Cast 
 Salman Khan: Raja
 Neelam Kothari: Renuka /Rani 
 Asrani: Markutey
 Tiku Talsania: Police Inspector
 Javed Khan Amrohi:Police Constable
 Shobha Khote: Mrs. Prasad
 Anupam Kher: Bhagwati Prasad
 Subbiraj: Lawyer
 Sumeet Pathak: Chotu
 Arun Mathur: School Principal 
 Mushtaq Khan:: School Teacher,

Soundtrack

References

External links

1992 films
1990s Hindi-language films
Films scored by Anand–Milind